Mollaoba is a village and municipality in the Masally District of Azerbaijan. It has a population of 2,576.

References

Populated places in Masally District